David George John Ellett (born March 30, 1964) is an American-born Canadian former professional ice hockey defenceman who played in the NHL for 16 seasons. He was born in Cleveland because his father, Bob, was a minor-league hockey player playing for the Cleveland Barons of the AHL.

Playing career 
Ellett was drafted 75th overall by the Winnipeg Jets in the 1982 NHL Entry Draft and then played the next two seasons at Bowling Green State University. In Ellett's second (and final) season at BGSU (1983–84), the Falcons won the NCAA Championship. When Ellett joined the Jets in 1984, he was a solid defenseman right away, scoring 38 points and garnering a +20 plus/minus rating. He became part of a solid Jets nucleus in the mid-to-late 80's that had the misfortune of playing in the same division as the dominant Edmonton Oilers and Calgary Flames. As a result, Ellett did not garner very much late-round playoff experience with the Jets.

Ellett's most notable moment with the Jets came in the 1990 Smythe Division semi-final series against the Edmonton Oilers. With the game tied at 2–2 in the second overtime period, Ellett scored a power play goal to give the Jets the win and a 3–1 series lead. Despite losing the next 3 games to the Oilers, this goal is considered the most memorable goal in the Jets' NHL history.

In the middle of the 1990–91 season, Ellett was traded to the Toronto Maple Leafs with Paul Fenton for Ed Olczyk and Mark Osborne. It was with the Leafs that Ellett transitioned from an offensive defenceman into a solid two-way rearguard. He was an integral part to the Leafs clubs of 1993 and 1994 that reached the Conference Finals.

Ellett was traded to the New Jersey Devils with Doug Gilmour in the 1996–97 season, but only played with the club until the end of the season. He then played with the Boston Bruins for two years and then the St. Louis Blues for a year before retiring. He played his 1000th career game with Boston on March 1, 1998, against the New York Islanders. He retired in 2000.

In 1989 Ellett was the subject of controversy when he decided to play for Team Canada in the World Championships. Bob Johnson, coach of the American team, complained that Ellett had to play for the United States because of his birthplace and because he attended Team USA's training camp for the 1987 Canada Cup. Ellett was allowed to play for Team Canada because he never actually played for the USA internationally.

Ellett was part of one of Wayne Gretzky's most-remembered goals. In Game 7 of the 1993 Campbell Conference Finals between the Leafs and the Los Angeles Kings, Gretzky scored a hat trick. He scored his third goal from behind the net by banking it off Ellett's skate and past the Toronto goaltender, Félix Potvin. Ellett returned the favor by scoring for Toronto with just over a minute remaining, but Los Angeles hung on to win the game and go to the Stanley Cup Finals against Montreal.

Awards and honours

Records
Most points by a Toronto Maple Leafs defenceman in a playoff year (18 in 1994)
Most assists by a Toronto Maple Leafs defenceman in a playoff year (15 in 1994)

Career statistics

Regular season and playoffs

International

See also
List of NHL players with 1000 games played

References

External links
 
 Hockey Draft Central

1964 births
American men's ice hockey defensemen
Boston Bruins players
Bowling Green Falcons men's ice hockey players
Bowling Green State University alumni
Canadian ice hockey defencemen
Ice hockey people from Cleveland
Living people
National Hockey League All-Stars
New Jersey Devils players
St. Louis Blues players
Toronto Maple Leafs players
Winnipeg Jets (1979–1996) draft picks
Winnipeg Jets (1979–1996) players
NCAA men's ice hockey national champions